These are the full results of the 1998 Ibero-American Championships in Athletics which took place on July 17–18, 1998 on Estádio Universitário in Lisbon, Portugal.

Men's results

100 meters

Heats – July 17Wind:Heat 1: -0.3 m/s, Heat 2: +1.4 m/s

Final – July 17Wind:+1.0 m/s

Extra – July 17Wind:0.0 m/s

200 meters

Heats – July 18Wind:Heat 1: -1.2 m/s, Heat 2: -1.7 m/s

Final – July 18Wind:+0.7 m/s

400 meters

Heats – July 18

Final – July 18

800 meters
July 19

1500 meters
July 18

5000 meters
July 19

10,000 meters
July 17

110 meters hurdles
July 18Wind: +0.6 m/s

400 meters hurdles

Heats – July 18

Final – July 19

3000 meters steeplechase
July 19

4 x 100 meters relay
July 19

4 x 400 meters relay
July 19

20 kilometers walk
July 17

High jump
July 19

Pole vault
July 18

Long jump
July 17

Triple jump
July 19

Shot put
July 18

Discus throw
July 17

Hammer throw
July 18

Javelin throw
July 19

Decathlon
July 17–18

Women's results

100 meters

Heats – July 17Wind:Heat 1: +0.1 m/s, Heat 2: +1.7 m/s

Final – July 17Wind:0.0 m/s

Extra – July 17Wind:0.0 m/s

200 meters

Heats – July 18Wind:Heat 1: +1.0 m/s, Heat 2: -0.5 m/s

Final – July 18Wind:+0.7 m/s

400 meters

Heats – July 17

Final – July 18

800 meters
July 19

1500 meters
July 18

5000 meters
July 17

10,000 meters
July 18

100 meters hurdles
July 17Wind: +2.0 m/s

400 meters hurdles
July 18

4 x 100 meters relay
July 19

4 x 400 meters relay
July 19

10,000 meters walk
July 18

High jump
July 18

Pole vault
July 17

Long jump
July 18

Triple jump
July 17

Shot put
July 19

Discus throw
July 18

Hammer throw
July 17

Javelin throw
July 17

Heptathlon
July 17–18

References

Ibero-American Championships Results
Events at the Ibero-American Championships in Athletics